Premonition of Love is a 1982 Soviet comedy film directed by Tofik Shakhverdiev.

Plot 
The film tells about a young inventor by the name of Sergey, who is in search of love and suddenly falls in love with a modest and charming Lena.

Cast 
 Aleksandr Abdulov as Sergey Vishnyakov
 Irina Alfyorova as Yelena
 Mikhail Gluzskiy as Ivan Kryukov
 Vladimir Basov as Vasya
 Tatyana Kravchenko as Olga
 Roma Merkulov
 Igor Yasulovich
 Mikhail Svetin
 Georgiy Strokov
 Lidiya Smirnova as Mariya Georgiyevna

References

External links 
 

1982 films
1980s Russian-language films
Soviet comedy films
1982 comedy films